"Il' je vedro, il' oblačno" (English: It's either clear (no clouds in the sky), or clouded) is a Bosnian traditional folk song Sevdalinka. It was interpreted by several notable singers: Emina Zečaj, Hanka Paldum, Božo Vrećo, Zaim Imamović.

In popular culture
Adi Lukovac's and Emina Zečaj's version was used in the 2003 Bosnian film Remake (Remake - soundtrack), which made the song worldwide famous. In the cult scene, it was performed by the actor Mario Drmać, whose unique voice contributed to its success.

Lyrics

See also
Music of Bosnia and Herzegovina
Soundtrack

References

Bosnia and Herzegovina songs
Bosnia and Herzegovina folk music